This article is a list of diseases of mint (Mentha piperita, M. cardiaca, M. spicata and M. arvensis).

Fungal diseases

Nematodes, parasitic

Viral diseases

References
Common Names of Diseases, The American Phytopathological Society

Lists of plant diseases
Gardening lists